PAOU may refer one of the following

 PAOU, airport code for Nelson Lagoon Airport in Alaska, USA
 Petroleum Authority of Uganda